Rylstone is a village and civil parish in the Craven district of North Yorkshire, England. It is situated very near to Cracoe and about 6 miles south west of Grassington. The population of the civil parish as of the 2011 census was 160.

Rylstone railway station opened in 1902, closed to passengers in 1930, and closed completely in 1969.

The members of Rylstone and District Women's Institute were the inspiration for the 2003 film Calendar Girls, although the film was shot based in nearby Kettlewell.

On 5 July 2014, the Tour de France Stage 1 from Leeds to Harrogate passed through the village.

Rylstone is referenced in the poem entitled The White Doe of Rylstone by William Wordsworth.

See also
St Peter's Church, Rylstone

References

External links

Villages in North Yorkshire
Civil parishes in North Yorkshire